Stephen R. Hilbert is an American mathematician best known as co-author of the Bramble–Hilbert lemma, which he published with James H. Bramble in 1970. Hilbert's area of specialty is numerical analysis. He has been a professor of mathematics at Ithaca College since 1968. Additionally, he taught mathematics at Cornell University as a visiting program professor during the 2003–2004 academic year.

Early life and education
Hilbert was born in Brooklyn, New York. As a teenager, he attended Regis High School in New York City. He received his BS in mathematics from the University of Notre Dame in 1964 and his PhD in applied mathematics from the University of Maryland in 1969. He completed his dissertation, Numerical Solutions of Elliptic Partial Differential Equations, with Bramble as his advisor.

Awards and honors
Distinguished College Teaching of Mathematics Award – 1994 – Seaway Section of the Mathematical Association of America
Dana Teaching Fellow – 1985
Dana Teaching Fellow – 1982
Outstanding Faculty Award – 1979 – School of Humanities and Sciences, Ithaca College

Publications
Barron's GMAT. Jaffe, Eugene D., and Stephen Hilbert, 2009, Barron's Educational Series, 497 pgs
Calculus: An Active Approach with Projects. Hilbert, Stephen, et al., 1993–1994, John Wiley & Sons; Reissued 2010 by Mathematical Association of America, 307 pgs
Estimation of Linear Functionals on Sobolev Spaces with Application to Fourier Transforms and Spline Interpolation. Bramble, James H., and Stephen R. Hilbert.  SIAM Journal on Numerical Analysis (Society for Industrial and Applied Mathematics) (Vol. 7, No. 1 (Mar., 1970)): 112–124.
A Mollifier Useful for Approximations in Sobolev Spaces and Some Applications to Approximating Solutions of Differential Equations. Hilbert, Stephen. Mathematics of Computation (American Mathematical Society) (Vol. 27, No. 121 (Jan., 1973)): 81–89.

References

External links
 

Year of birth missing (living people)
Living people
20th-century American mathematicians
21st-century American mathematicians
Cornell University faculty
Ithaca College faculty
Mathematicians from New York (state)
People from New York City
Regis High School (New York City) alumni
University of Maryland, College Park alumni
University of Notre Dame alumni